Chirinos District is one of seven districts of the province San Ignacio in Peru.

References